Guido Vedovato (30 June 1961 in Vicenza, Italy) Italian naïve painter and sculptor.

Vedovato is one of the best-known Naïve artists. He was born in Vicenza, northern part of Italy. He lives and works in Camisano Vicentino. He graduated as an economist and had no artist scholar background. Yugoslavian Naïve art had a big effect on his works. It made him to start painting at the end of the 1970s. At the beginning it was one of his hobbies however later it became his passion.

He wants to depict short stories in his paintings. We may have a look at the life of the modern villages in the Italian chains of the Alps. Some of his well-known paints depicts animals in the night, but—as he said, he preferred to paint humans.

Works in collections 

 Museum of Naive Art - Jagodina (Serbia), 
 Museo Nazionale della Arti Naives „Cesare Zavattini” – Luzzara (Italy), 
 Musée International d’Art Naive – Bages (France), 
 Slovenian Naive Art Museum - Trebnje (Slovenia), 
 Museo Internacional de Arte Naif Manuel Moral – Jaén (Spain), 
 MAN – Musée d’Art Naif - Béraut (France), 
 Vihorlatské Osvetové Stredisko - Homonna (Slovakia), 
 Musée d’Art Naive International Yvon M. Daigle, Quebec (Canada), 
 MIDAN – Musée International d’Art Naive- Vicq  (France), 
 Museo Civico „Umberto Nobile” e d’Arte Naive – Lauro (Italy), 
 Musée d'Art Spontané, Brussels (Belgium), 
 Moscow State Museum of Naive Art – Moscow (Russia),
 Magyar Naiv Művészek Múzeuma - Kecskemét (Hungary),
 Gallery of Szombathely - Szombathely (Hungary),
 Evere Municipality Art Collection - Brussels (Belgium)
 Balaton Museum - Keszthely (Hungary).

Exhibitions 
2015 - Balaton Museum, Keszthely, Hungary (solo)
2014 - National Library of Foreign Literature, Budapest, Hungary (solo)
2013 - Gallery of Szombathely, Szombathely, Hungary (solo)
2013 - House of Civil Communities - Gebauer Gallery, Pécs, Hungary (solo)
2012 - Le Musée d'Art Spontané, Brussels, Belgium (solo)
2012 - 16th Colony of naive and marginal art, Museum of Naive Art, Jagodina, Serbia
2012 - Museum of Hungarian Naive Artists, Kecskemét, Hungary (solo)
2012 - Újpest Art Gallery, Budapest, Hungary (solo)
2008 - Institute of Italian Culture, Kneza Miloša, Serbia
2008 - Galeria Eboli, Madrid
2008 - The Four Seasons: The Naïve Art of Italy, GINA Gallery of International Naïve Art, Tel Aviv, Israel
2007 - Moscow State Museum of Naïve Art, Moscow, Russia
2007 - Rassegna Internazionale Naif Mandria, Chivasso, Italy
2007 - Michalovce, Slovak Republic (solo)
2007 - Bardejov, Slovak Republic (solo)
2007 - Piwnice Gallery, Przemyśl, Poland (solo)
2006 - Svidnik, Slovak Republic (solo)
2006 - Vihorlatske Muzeum, Humenne, Slovak Republic (solo)
2006 - International Meeting of Naïve Art, Verneuil su Avre, France
2006 - Premio Nazionale Naif Cesare Zavattini, Luzzara, Italy
2005 - International Meeting of Naïve Artists, Trebnje, Slovenia
2004 - Premio Nazionale Naif Cesare Zavattini, Luzzara, Italy
2003 - Premio Internazionale Naif Varenna, Varenna, Italy
2003 - Gaianigo Gallery, Sovizzo, Italy (solo)
2001 - Villa Thiene, Quinto Vicentino, Italy (solo)
2000 - Naïve Art Exhibition, Bagnolo San Vito, Italy (solo)
1995 - Naïve Art Exhibition, Bagnolo San Vito, Italy (solo)
1992 - Naïve Art Exhibition, Bagnolo San Vito, Italy (solo)

See also
Naive art

External links

http://www.museumsyndicate.com/artist.php?artist=909 
http://www.visionmagazine.com/archives/1012/1012_Artist.html
Vedovato's painting
Exhibitions

Italian still life painters
Living people
1961 births